Undermind is a 2003 psychological thriller film written and directed by Nevil Dwek and starring Sam Trammell, Erik Jensen, and Susan May Pratt.

Plot
Derrick, a corporate lawyer with a large trust fund, and Zane, a criminal, live in opposite social spheres. Although they never meet, their lives are more connected than either one of them could ever imagine.

Cast

References

External links 
 

2003 films
2003 psychological thriller films
American psychological horror films
2000s English-language films
2000s American films